Anadin Suljaković (born 16 June 1998) is a Bosnian-born Qatari handball player who plays for HSG Wetzlar and the Qatari national team.

He represented Qatar at the 2019 World Men's Handball Championship.

References

1998 births
Living people
Qatari male handball players